The horned lark or shore lark (Eremophila alpestris) is a species of lark in the family Alaudidae found across the northern hemisphere. It is known as "horned lark" in North America and "shore lark" in Europe.

Taxonomy, evolution and systematics
The specific alpestris is Latin and means "of the high mountains", from Alpes, the Alps.

The horned lark was originally classified in the genus Alauda.

The horned lark is suggested to have diverged from Temminck's lark (E. bilopha) around the Early-Middle Pleistocene, according to genomic divergence estimates. The horned lark is known from around a dozen localities of Late Pleistocene age, including those in Italy, Russia, The United Kingdom and the United States. The earliest known fossil is from the Calabrian of Spain, around 1–0.8 million years old. In 2020, a 46,000 year old frozen specimen was described from the Russian Far East.

Recent genetic analysis has suggested that the species consists of six clades that in the future may warrant recognition as separate species. A 2020 study also suggested splitting of the species, but into 4 species instead, the Himalayan horned lark E. longirostris, mountain horned lark E. penicillata, common horned lark E. alpestris (sensu stricto), alongside Temminck's lark.

Subspecies 
Forty-two subspecies are recognized: 
 Pallid horned lark (E. a. arcticola) – (Oberholser, 1902): Found from northern Alaska to British Columbia (western Canada)
 Hoyt's horned lark (E. a. hoyti) – (Bishop, 1896): Found in northern Canada
 Northern American horned lark (E. a. alpestris) – (Linnaeus, 1758): Found in eastern Canada
 Dusky horned lark (E. a. merrilli) – (Dwight, 1890): Found on western coast of Canada and USA
 Streaked horned lark (E. a. strigata) – (Henshaw, 1884): Found on coastal southern British Columbia (western Canada) to coastal Oregon (western USA)
 St. Helens horned lark (E. a. alpina) – (Jewett, 1943): Found on mountains of western Washington (northwestern USA)
 Oregon horned lark (E. a. lamprochroma) – (Oberholser, 1932): Found on inland mountains of western USA
 Desert horned lark (E. a. leucolaema) – Coues, 1874: Also known as the pallid horned lark. Found from southern Alberta (southwestern Canada) through north-central and central USA
 Saskatchewan horned lark (E. a. enthymia) – (Oberholser, 1902): Found from south-central Canada to Oklahoma and Texas (central USA)
 Prairie horned lark (E. a. praticola) – (Henshaw, 1884): Found in southeastern Canada, northeastern and east-central USA
 Sierra horned lark (E. a. sierrae) – (Oberholser, 1920): Also known as the Sierra Nevada horned lark. Found on mountains of northeastern California (western USA)
 Ruddy horned lark (E. a. rubea) – (Henshaw, 1884): Found in central California (western USA)
 Utah horned lark (E. a. utahensis) – (Behle, 1938): Found on mountains of west-central USA
 Island horned lark (E. a. insularis) – (Dwight, 1890): Found on islands off southern California (western USA)
 California horned lark (E. a. actia) – (Oberholser, 1902): Found on coastal mountains of southern California (western USA) and northern Baja California (northwestern Mexico)
 Mohave horned lark (E. a. ammophila) – (Oberholser, 1902): Found in deserts of southeastern California and southwestern Nevada (southwestern USA)
 Sonora horned lark (E. a. leucansiptila) – (Oberholser, 1902): Found in deserts of southern Nevada, western Arizona (southwestern USA) and northwestern Mexico
 Montezuma horned lark (E. a. occidentalis) – (McCall, 1851): Originally described as a separate species. Found in northern Arizona to central New Mexico (southwestern USA)
 Scorched horned lark (E. a. adusta) – (Dwight, 1890): Found in southern Arizona and southern New Mexico (southwestern USA), possibly north-central Mexico
 Magdalena horned lark (E. a. enertera) – (Oberholser, 1907): Found in central Baja California (northwestern Mexico)
 Texas horned lark (E. a. giraudi) – (Henshaw, 1884): Found in coastal south-central USA and northeastern Mexico
 E. a. aphrasta – (Oberholser, 1902): Found in Chihuahua and Durango (northwestern Mexico)
 E. a. lactea – Phillips, AR, 1970: Found in Coahuila (north-central Mexico)
 E. a. diaphora – (Oberholser, 1902): Found in southern Coahuila to northeastern Puebla (north-central and eastern Mexico)
 Mexican horned lark (E. a. chrysolaema) – (Wagler, 1831): Originally described as a separate species in the genus Alauda. Found from west-central to east-central Mexico
 E. a. oaxacae – (Nelson, 1897): Found in southern Mexico
 Colombian horned lark (E. a. peregrina) – (Sclater, PL, 1855): Originally described as a separate species. Found in Colombia
 Shore lark (E. a. flava) – (Gmelin, JF, 1789): Originally described as a separate species in the genus Alauda. Found in northern Europe and northern Asia
 Steppe horned lark (E. a. brandti) – (Dresser, 1874): Also known as Brandt's horned lark. Originally described as a separate species. Found from southeastern European Russia to western Mongolia and northern China
 Moroccan horned lark (E. a. atlas) – (Whitaker, 1898): This subspecies is also called "shore lark". Originally described as a separate species. Found in Morocco
 Balkan horned lark (E. a. balcanica) – (Reichenow, 1895): This subspecies is also called "shore lark". Found in southern Balkans and Greece
 E. a. kumerloevei – Roselaar, 1995: Found in western and central Asia Minor
 Southern horned lark (E. a. penicillata) – (Gould, 1838): This subspecies is also called "shore lark". Originally described as a separate species in the genus Alauda. Found from eastern Turkey and the Caucasus to Iran
 Lebanon horned lark (E. a. bicornis) – (Brehm, CL, 1842): This subspecies is also called "shore lark". Originally described as a separate species. Found from Lebanon to Israel/Syria border
 Pamir horned lark (E. a. albigula) – (Bonaparte, 1850): This subspecies is also called "shore lark". Originally described as a separate species. Found from northeastern Iran and Turkmenistan to northwestern Pakistan
 E. a. argalea – (Oberholser, 1902): This subspecies is also called "shore lark". Found in extreme western China
 Przewalski's lark (E. a. teleschowi) – (Przewalski, 1887): This subspecies is also called "shore lark". Originally described as a separate species. Found in western and west-central China
 E. a. przewalskii – (Bianchi, 1904): This subspecies is also called "shore lark". Found in northern Qinghai (west-central China)
 E. a. nigrifrons – (Przewalski, 1876): This subspecies is also called "shore lark". Originally described as a separate species. Found in northeastern Qinghai (west-central China)
 Long-billed horned lark (E. a. longirostris) – (Moore, F, 1856): This subspecies is also called "shore lark". Originally described as a separate species. Found in northeastern Pakistan and western Himalayas
 E. a. elwesi – (Blanford, 1872): This subspecies is also called "shore lark". Originally described as a separate species. Found on southern and eastern Tibetan Plateau
 E. a. khamensis – (Bianchi, 1904): This subspecies is also called "shore lark". Found in southwestern and south-central China

Description 
Unlike most other larks, this is a distinctive-looking species on the ground, mainly brown-grey above and pale below, with a striking black and yellow face pattern. Except for the central feathers, the tail is mostly black, contrasting with the paler body; this contrast is especially noticeable when the bird is in flight. The summer male has black "horns", which give this species its American name. North America has a number of races distinguished by the face pattern and back colour of males, especially in summer. The southern European mountain race E. a. penicillata is greyer above, and the yellow of the face pattern is replaced with white.

Measurements:

 Length: 6.3-7.9 in (16-20 cm)
 Weight: 1.0-1.7 oz (28-48 g)
 Wingspan: 11.8-13.4 in (30-34 cm)

Vocalizations are high-pitched, lisping or tinkling, and weak. The song, given in flight as is common among larks, consists of a few chips followed by a warbling, ascending trill.

Distribution and habitat 

The horned lark breeds across much of North America from the high Arctic south to the Isthmus of Tehuantepec, northernmost Europe and Asia and in the mountains of southeast Europe. There is also an isolated population on a plateau in Colombia. It is mainly resident in the south of its range, but northern populations of this passerine bird are migratory, moving further south in winter.

This is a bird of open ground. In Eurasia it breeds above the tree line in mountains and the far north. In most of Europe, it is most often seen on seashore flats in winter, leading to the European name. In the UK it is found as a winter stopover along the coasts and in eastern England. In North America, where there are no other larks to compete with, it is also found on farmland, on prairies, in deserts, on golf courses and airports.

Breeding and nesting 

Males defend territories from other males during breeding season and females will occasionally chase away intruding females. Courting involves the male singing to the female while flying above her in circles. He then will fold his wings in and dive towards the female, opening his wings just before reaching the ground.
The nest site is selected in the early spring by only the female and is either a natural depression in the bare ground or she digs a cavity using her bill and feet. She will spend 2–4 days preparing the site before building her nest. She weaves fine grasses, cornstalks, small roots, and other plant material and lines it with down, fur, feathers, and occasionally lint. The nest is about 3-4 inches in diameter with the interior diameter about 2.5 in wide and 1.5 in deep. It has been noted that she often adds a “doorstep” of pebbles, corncobs, or dung on one side of the nest. It is speculated that this is used to cover the excavated dirt and hide her nest more.

Females will lay a clutch of 2-5 gray eggs with brown spots, each about 1 in long and 0.5 in wide. Incubation will take 10–12 days until hatching and then the nestling period will take 8–10 days. During the nestling period, the chick is fed and defended by both parents. A female in the south can lay 2-3 broods a year while in the north, 1 brood a year is more common.

The structure of horned lark nests can vary depending on the microclimate, prevailing weather and predation risk, revealing flexibility in nesting behaviour to adjust to changing environmental conditions to maintain nest survival and nestling size development.

Status and conservation 
Horned lark populations are declining according to the North American Breeding Bird Survey. In 2016, the Partners in Flight Landbird Conservation Plan detailed the horned lark as a “Common Bird in Steep Decline,” but the horned lark as of 2016 is not on the State of North America's Birds’ Watch List. This species’ decline could be contributed to the loss of habitat due to agricultural pesticides, the disturbed sites the birds prefer reverting to forested lands through reforestation efforts, urbanization and human encroachment as well as collisions with wind turbines. In the open areas of western North America, horned larks are among the bird species most often killed by wind turbines. In 2013, the U.S. Fish and Wildlife Service listed the subspecies streaked horned lark as threatened under the Endangered Species Act.

Gallery

References

Further reading 
 van den Berg, Arnoud (2005) Morphology of Atlas Horned Lark Dutch Birding 27(4):256–8
 Small, Brian (2002) The Horned Lark on the Isles of Scilly Birding World 15(3): 111–20 (discusses a possible Nearctic race bird on the Isles of Scilly in 2001)

External links

Picture – Cyberbirding
 Species account – Cornell Lab of Ornithology
 
 Horned lark – Eremophila alpestris – USGS Patuxent Bird Identification InfoCenter
 
 

horned lark
Holarctic birds
horned lark
horned lark